National Institute of Occupational Health, also known as Statens arbeidsmiljøinstitutt or STAMI is a government body organised by the Norwegian Ministry of Labour and Social Inclusion. The institute deals with a range of occupational health areas, with staff with competence in medicine, physiology, chemistry, biology, psychology, and other disciplines. The institute deals with all aspects of Norwegian working life, and works in both environmental and health fields, and often visits workplaces to look into their health practices. The institute has an occupational health clinic which treats patients with work related illnesses. This is also used to train health professionals and other students.

Sections
The National Institute of Occupational Health is split into six sections:

 Information, libraries, and learning
 Administration
 Work medicine
 Work physiology
 Toxicology
 Work hygiene

External links
 

Government agencies of Norway
Occupational safety and health organizations
Medical and health organisations based in Norway